The Atlantic County Board of Chosen Freeholders is a body of nine people that govern Atlantic County, New Jersey alongside the county executive. The members of the board are referred to as freeholders.

Background 
The members of the board are elected in two different ways. Five of the members are elected from popular vote through districts. The last four are elected from an at-large popular vote. Atlantic County adopted the executive form of government. The freeholders create the laws of the county.

Districts

1st District 
Townships:

Atlantic City, Egg Harbor, Pleasantville.

2nd District 
Townships:

Atlantic City, Egg Harbor, Linwood, Long Port, Margate, Northfield, Somers Point, Ventnor.

3rd District 
Townships:

Egg Harbor, Hamilton Township.

4th District 
Townships:

Absecon, Brigantine, Galloway Township, Port Republic.

5th District 
Townships:

Buena Borough, Buena Township, Corbin City, Egg Harbor City, Estell Manor, Folsom Borough, Hamilton Township, Hammonton, Mullica Township, Weymouth.

Party affiliation

Freeholders

References 

Atlantic County, New Jersey
County government in New Jersey